Furuset kulturpark is a park in the neighborhood of Furuset in Oslo, Norway. It opened in May 2009 at a cost of NOK 5.6 million. 

The 15.2 acre park is operated by the municipality and is used for recreational purposes, with a pedestrian and bicycle paths and a recreational area. 
Furuset Church (Furuset Kirke) is in the vicinity. In the park there is a field of flowers and flowering trees and a pond. In the summer months, goats from Nordre Lindeberg 4H-farm are let out to graze in a paddock in the park.

References

Parks in Oslo